Shahrud is a musical instrument.

Shahrud may also refer to:

Shahrud, Iran, a city in Semnan Province, Iran
Shahrud County, an administrative subdivision of Semnan Province, Iran
Shahrud District, an administrative subdivision of Ardabil Province, Iran
Shahrud Rural District, an administrative subdivision of Ardabil Province, Iran
Shahrud, Hormozgan, a village in Hormozgan Province, Iran
Shahrud, Lorestan, a village in Lorestan Province, Iran
Shahrood (River), a river in northern Iran